Diyorbek Urozboev  (born 17 August 1993) is an Uzbekistani judoka.

He won a bronze medal at the 2016 Summer Olympics in Rio de Janeiro.

Biography
In 2011, he took third place at the Masters Bremen tournament among participants under the age of 20 (U20) and the European Cup (U20), and won the Asian Championship in Beirut in the same age category. In 2012, he was second in the International Judo Federation Cup in Tashkent, third in the Asian U20 Championship, fifth in the Abu Dhabi Grand Prix and Grand Slam tournaments in Tokyo. In 2013, he was third in the European Cup U21 and silver medalist of the World Championship in the same age category. In 2014, he was second at the Tashkent Grand Prix, and only seventh at the Grand Slam tournament in Baku.

In 2015 he recorded the second place in the Open European Cup in Warsaw, third place at the Grand Prix of Tbilisi, Grand Prix Tashkent, Grand Slam tournament in Abu Dhabi, the fifth place at the Samsun Grand Prix, and the World Masters tournament in Rabat . At the World Cup was the seventh.

In 2016 he won the Grand Prix of Tbilisi, was third at the Samsun Grand Prix, Alma-Ata Grand Prix, Grand Slam tournament in Baku and the seventh at the World Masters tournament in Guadalajara. In the same year he managed to win the title of vice-champion of Asia.

Performed at the Olympic Games in 2016, in the category of up to 60 kilograms, where 35 judoka wrestled. The athletes were divided into 4 groups, of which four judoists reached the semi-finals in the quarterfinals. Losers in the quarter finals met in the "comforting" bouts and then with the injured in the semi-finals, and these results determined the bronze medalists.

In 2021, he competed in the men's 60 kg event at the 2021 Judo World Masters held in Doha, Qatar.

References

External links

1993 births
Living people
Uzbekistani male judoka
Olympic judoka of Uzbekistan
Judoka at the 2016 Summer Olympics
Medalists at the 2016 Summer Olympics
Olympic bronze medalists for Uzbekistan
Olympic medalists in judo
Judoka at the 2018 Asian Games
Asian Games gold medalists for Uzbekistan
Asian Games medalists in judo
Medalists at the 2018 Asian Games
20th-century Uzbekistani people
21st-century Uzbekistani people